The Citadel Theatre is the major venue for theatre arts in the city of Edmonton, Alberta, Canada, located in the city's downtown core on Churchill Square. It is the third largest regional theatre in Canada.

History
It began in a former Salvation Army Citadel bought by Joseph H. Shoctor, James L. Martin, Ralph B. MacMillan, and Sandy Mactaggart. The theatre's first production to be performed was Who's Afraid of Virginia Woolf?. The theatre was founded on October 12, 1965 with its first opening night on November 10, 1965. In its current location, The Citadel has the distinction of being the only venue where the Jule Styne musical Pieces of Eight has been produced.

The organization moved to its current building just off Churchill Square in 1976. Architect Barton Myers designed the structure.  The building houses the Maclab, Shoctor, and Rice Theatres, Zeidler Hall, the Tucker Amphitheatre, and the Foote Theatre School.

The Maclab and Tucker are part of the Lee Pavilion, in the middle of Edmonton.

Artistic directors
John Hulburt (1965-1966)
Robert Glenn (1966-1968)
Sean Mulcahy (1968-1973)
John Neville (1973-1978)
Peter Coe (1978-1981)
Joseph H. Shoctor (1981-1984, as Producer)
Gordon McDougall (1984-1987)
William Fisher (1987-1989)
Richard Dennison (1989-1990, as Producer)
Robin Phillips (1990-1995, as Director General)
Duncan McIntosh (1995-1999)
Bob Baker (director) (1999–2016)
Daryl Cloran (2016 - )

Productions

2018–19 Season
 Once: September 22 to October 14, 2018 (Mainstage)
 Redpatch: November 1 to 11, 2018 (Add-On)
 Miss Bennet: Christmas at Pemberley: November 17 to December 9, 2018 (Mainstage)
 A Christmas Carol: November 30 to December 23, 2018 (Seasonal Presentation)
 Sweat: January 12 to February 3, 2019 (Mainstage)
 Matilda: February 16 to March 17, 2019 (Mainstage)
 The Candidate: March 30 to April 21, 2019 (Mainstage)
 The Party: March 30 to April 21, 2019 (Add-On)
 The Tempest: April 20 to May 12, 2019 (Mainstage)

References

https://www.theglobeandmail.com/arts/theatre-and-performance/immersed-in-edmonton-tony-nominee-rachel-chavkin-grows-hadestown-towards-broadway/article37080314/
https://www.nytimes.com/2017/12/11/theater/an-unexpected-new-stop-on-the-road-to-broadway-edmonton.html
https://edmontonjournal.com/entertainment/local-arts/get-way-down-with-hadestown-onstage-at-the-citadel

External links
Citadel Theatre
Theatre History
Citadel Theatre fonds (R3498) at Library and Archives Canada

Theatre companies in Alberta
Theatres in Edmonton
Tourist attractions in Edmonton
Barton Myers buildings
1965 establishments in Alberta
Theatres completed in 1965